Cleberson Martins de Souza (born 17 August 1992), simply known as Cleberson, is a Brazilian professional footballer who plays as a central defender for Madura United.

Club career
Cleberson was born in Macatuba, São Paulo. He joined Atlético Paranaense's youth setup in 2010, after starting it out at Cruzeiro.

On 19 May 2012, after appearing sparingly in the year's Campeonato Paranaense, Cleberson made his professional debut, playing the entire second half in a 4–1 away routing over Joinville for the Série B championship. He appeared in 33 matches during the campaign, scoring his first goal on 24 November against Paraná, as Furacão was promoted to Série A at first attempt.

A backup of Léo and Manoel, Cleberson only appeared in six matches during the 2013 season, making his debut in the main category on 26 May 2013, starting in a 1–2 away loss against Fluminense. He scored his first goal in the competition on 24 November, netting the last of a 6–1 home routing over Náutico.

After profiting from Léo's departure to Flamengo, Cleberson was made a starter by manager Miguel Ángel Portugal. On 5 September 2014 he signed a new deal with the club, running until 2017.

References

External links
Atlético Paranaense profile 

1992 births
Living people
Footballers from São Paulo (state)
Brazilian footballers
Association football defenders
Campeonato Brasileiro Série A players
Campeonato Brasileiro Série B players
Liga 1 (Indonesia) players
Club Athletico Paranaense players
Figueirense FC players
Sport Club do Recife players
Centro Sportivo Alagoano players
Esporte Clube Juventude players
Ituano FC players
Madura United F.C. players
Brazilian expatriate footballers
Brazilian expatriate sportspeople in Indonesia
Expatriate footballers in Indonesia